Denis Dominique Cardonne (23 March 1721 – 25 December 1783) was a French orientalist and translator.

Biography 
Denis Dominique Cardonne, born in Paris on March 23, 1721, he was brought at the age of nine to Constantinople, where he lived for twenty years before returning to France, where he became the secretary-interpreter of the king in oriental languages, royal censor and inspector of the library. He was nominated as a professor of the Collège royal, where he was the titular of the chair for Turkish and Persian from 1750 to his death.

He is the grandfather of the Desgranges brothers, Antoine Jérôme Desgranges (24 December 1784 - 1864) and Alix Desgranges (1793-1854), both orientalists. The former was a student at the École des Jeunes de langues from November 1793 to Brumaire year IX, and then moved to Constantinople, while the latter was made count and became a professor in Turkish at the École des jeunes de langues de Louis Le Grand and the Collège de France in 1833, until he was replaced in the latter by Joseph Matturin Cor on April 5, 1854.

Works

Traductions 

 (started by Antoine Galland, and finished by Cardonne)

References 

1721 births
1783 deaths
Academic staff of the Collège de France
French orientalists
French translators
Writers from Paris
French male non-fiction writers
18th-century French translators